Waring is an English surname.

Waring may also refer to:

Waring, Texas, a community in the United States
Waring Point, a headland in Wrangel Island, Chukotka, Russian Federation
Waring School, Beverly, Massachusetts, United States
Waring & Gillow, English furniture manufacturer and retailer
A brand of Conair Corporation

See also
Waering, a surname
Wareing, a surname
Wearing (surname)